Sandy Stewart was a college volleyball coach. She coached the Iowa Hawkeyes from 1982-88.

Career

Iowa
Sandy Stewart only received an interview from one university, the University of Iowa. She coached the Iowa Hawkeyes women's volleyball team from 1982-1988.

Her first season in 1982 the team finished with a 9-22 record. In 1983, her team finished with a record of 22-9 and she was the Big Ten Coach of the Year. They finished second in the conference, which was the highest ever for the team.

Stewart kept her team on an alcohol- and sugar-free diet.

Stewart started the 1986 season optimistic that the team could win a Big Ten championship. The team finished the 1986 season third in the Big Ten Conference with a record of 12-6. She signed four recruits for the 1987 season.

She resigned in 1989, citing the need for a career change. She said that "I felt good about what I've done here, but I just know I have to move to something different." She also said the hardest part of quitting was telling her recruits. She finished her seven career with a record of 136-102.

Head coaching career

References

Iowa Hawkeyes volleyball
American volleyball coaches
Possibly living people
Year of birth missing